Morris's bat (Myotis morrisi) is a species of vesper bat in the family Vespertilionidae.
It is found in Ethiopia and Nigeria.
Its natural habitats are dry savanna, moist savanna, caves, and subterranean habitats (other than caves).

References

Mouse-eared bats
Taxonomy articles created by Polbot
Mammals described in 1971
Bats of Africa
Taxa named by John Edwards Hill